Don't Be Saprize is the debut album by the Road Dawgs, released on March 23, 1999 through Virgin Records.

Background
The Road Dawgs first started out in 1993 and, along with the Rottin Razkals, were closely associated with Naughty by Nature. The duo appeared on several songs by Naughty by Nature and Rottin Razkals in 1993 and 1995 but were unable to get a record deal. In 1998 the duo began working with Mack 10 and inked a deal with Virgin Records, who placed the Road Dawgs in its sublabel Noo Trybe. The duo then began work on their debut album, Don't Be Saprize.

Don't Be Saprize featured production from the Road Dawgs themselves, Clinton "Payback" Sands, Greg Royal and Naughty by Nature producer Kay Gee, who produced the song "Break Yourself" with Darren Lighty. The album also featured guest appearances from several prominent west coast rappers, including Mack 10, Ice Cube and Mc Eiht.

The album's lone single was "Bouncin'", it also had a promotional music video released for it. Mack 10 performed the chorus for the song and also appeared in the video.

Reception

The album was neither a critical nor commercial success. Don't be Saprize only made it to No. 91 on the Billboard Top R&B/Hip-Hop Albums. It peaked on the week of April 10, 1999 and dropped off the chart the following week.

Allmusic's Jon Azpiri gave the album 1.5 stars out of a possible five and had this to say about the album "...The group seems incapable of creating a consistent album. Lyrically, many of the tracks on the album, like "Gangbang Shit" and "Murderfest 99, wallow in ignorance. Aside from the single "Bouncin," there is little to recommend on this album."

Track listing
"The Block"- :27
"Bouncin'"- 4:42 (featuring Mack 10)
"Bonifide"- 3:24 (featuring Ms. Toi)
"Gang Bang Shit"- 4:51 (featuring Squeak Ru)
"Break Yourself"- 4:04 (featuring Vernell Sales)
"Qrown Me"- 4:36 (featuring Squeak Ru)
"Murderfest 99"- 4:42 (featuring Mack 10, Ice Cube, Mc Eiht and Boo Kapone)
"Match Made"- 4:05
"Do a Lick"- :35
"My Life"- 4:35
"You Ain't Know"- 3:34 (featuring Mack Ten and Ice Cube)
"Klientel"- 5:17
"Sick the Dawgs"- :16
"Don't Be Saprize"- 4:15

Charts

Personnel 

 Boo Kapone – performer
 Ice Cube – performer
 Mack 10 – performer
 MC Eiht – performer
 Ms. Toi – performer
 Road Dawgs – percussion
 Vernell Sales – performer
 Squeek-Ru – performer
  
 Ken Johnston – engineer
 Kay Gee – producer, mixing
 Adam Kudzin – mixing
 Darren Lighty – producer
 Mr. Payback – producer
 Road Dawgs – producer, mixing
 Greg Royal – producer, engineer, mixing
 Eddy Schreyer – mastering
 Mack 10 – executive producer

References

1999 debut albums
Road Dawgs albums
Virgin Records albums